Die Insel is German for "the island". It may refer to:
 The Island (1934 film), a 1934 German film
 Die Insel (magazine, 1899–1901), a German literary magazine
 Die Insel (magazine, 1926–1933), a German homosexual magazine
 Die Insel (magazine, 1950s), a German homophile magazine